Agenor Gołuchowski is the name of:

 Agenor Romuald Gołuchowski (1812–1875), Polish-Austrian politician
 Agenor Maria Gołuchowski (1849–1921), Polish-Austrian politician and diplomat, son of Agenor Romuald